These are the number-one songs of 2005 in the Australian ARIA singles chart.

Chart history

Number-one artists

References
Australian Record Industry Association (ARIA) official site

2005 in Australian music
Australia Singles
2005